Odisha Adarsha Vidyalaya Sanmouda, known as OAV Sanmouda, is an Odisha government school under the School and Mass education department. The school is located near the iron mining area of Gorumahisani in Rairangpur Block. The school is affiliated with the Central Board of Secondary Education (CBSE).

History
Odisha Adarsha Vidyalaya Sangathan was established on September 19, 2015, as a society under The Society Registration Act of Odisha. Odisha Adarsha Vidyalaya was founded by the Odisha Department of School and Mass Education at Sanmouda in 2016.

The General Body is the apex body of the Sangathan headed by Hon’ble Minister, School & Mass Education as Chairman. The Executive Body is headed by DC-cum-ACS as Chairman.

Affiliation
OAV Sanmouda is affiliated with the Central Board of Secondary Education, New Delhi, under the Affiliation number 1520048.

Admission 
Students from Rairangpur block, Class VI, are selected through an entrance Exam conducted each year by Odisha Adarsha Vidyalaya Sangathan and are given admission to VIth standard/class. The test is largely non-verbal and objective in nature and is designed to prevent any disadvantage to children from rural areas.

Housing
The school has four houses: Mahanadi House, Brahmani House, Subarnarekha House and Bansadhara House. The houses were named after some of Odisha's major rivers. All of the OAVs have this system of Housing.

Facilities
The school provides free uniforms, books, and mid-day meals up to class VIII.

The school has a two-storey building, including classrooms, Science laboratories, office, library, art room, computer lab, sports room, examination section, multipurpose room and a principal chamber.

Administration
The school is run by the School and Mass Education Department of Odisha.
To manage the day-to-day affairs in school a school management committee will be formed consisting the following members:
 Collector of the District - Chairman. 
 Executive Engineer, Rural Works/ - MembersR&B/PHD /RWS&S
 Executive Engineer of the concerned electricity supply/distribution company - Member
 Chief District Medical Officer - Member
 District Project Cordinator, SSA - Member
 District Welfare Officer - Member
 All Principals of Adarsha Vidyalaya (within the revenue district!) - Members
 Representative of premier Edn.Institution/University (Knowledge pool) - Member
 District Education Officer - Member Convener

To manage the internal affairs of schools, Vidyalaya Management Development Committee has been formed by the chairperson, Collector Mayurbhanj.

Faculty
Currently, the school employs Principal, 5 Post Graduate Teachers, 8 TGTs, 1 P.E.T, 1 computer teacher, 1 art teacher and 3 non teaching staff.

Activities

The school observes important commemorative days, 
Competitions like
 Science Olympiad
 Mathematics Olympiad
 National Talent Search Exam
 National Means Cum Merit Examination 
 Science Exhibition 
Various Inter-House Cocurricular Activities like
 Youth Parliament
 Hindi week 
 Annual sports meets
 Annual Day
 Mass Plantation
 National Science Day

Gallery

References

Schools in Odisha
Educational institutions established in 2016
2016 establishments in Odisha